The 9th Golden Melody Awards ceremony was held at the Sun Yat-sen Memorial Hall in Taipei on May 29, 1998.

References

External links
  9th Golden Melody Awards nominees 
  9th Golden Melody Awards winners 

Golden Melody Awards
Golden Melody Awards
Golden Melody Awards
Golden Melody Awards